Pedois is a genus of moths of the family Depressariidae.

Species
Pedois amaurophanes (Turner, 1947)
Pedois anthracias Lower, 1902
Pedois argillea (Turner, 1927)
Pedois ceramora (Meyrick, 1902)
Pedois cosmopoda Turner, 1900
Pedois epinephela (Turner, 1947)
Pedois haploceros (Turner, 1946)
Pedois humerana (Walker, 1863)
Pedois lewinella (Newman, 1856)
Pedois lutea (Turner, 1927)
Pedois rhaphidias (Turner, 1917)
Pedois rhodomita Turner, 1900
Pedois sarcinodes (Meyrick, 1921)
Pedois tripunctella (Walker, 1864)

References

"Pedois Lower, 1894" at Markku Savela's Lepidoptera and Some Other Life Forms

 
Depressariinae